Minase may refer to:

 (born 1995), Japanese actress, voice actress, and singer
 (born 1985), Japanese gravure idol and actress
, former village in Ogachi District, Akita, Japan
, Shinto shrine in Shimamoto, Mishima District, Osaka Prefecture, Japan
, train station in Shimamoto

Japanese-language surnames